Mecynorhina ugandensis is a beetle from the subfamily Cetoniinae, tribe Goliathini, it was described by Julius Moser in 1907. As suggested by its name, it is found in Uganda, but it is also present in adjacent parts of DR Congo.

Description

It is a large beetle, with males reaching 85 mm and females 60 mm in length.

Classification 
According to the last work of De Palma & Frantz, this species is included in the subgenus Mecynorrhinella Marais and Holm, 1992, and is a subspecies of Mecynorhina torquata.

For a simplification, we will follow Allard considering ugandensis as a good species.

Synonym 
Zdenĕk Tesař described in 1935 the Mecynorhina machulkai which is compared to Mecynorhina torquata, he seems not to know the species described by Moser.

Variations 
All the specimens of this species are rarely the same. Moser described it with red elytra ("elytris rubis"). In his paper, Tesař describes also several forms and illustrates many of them. Many varieties have been illustrated in The Beetles of the World, volume 7, plates 3–6. Here are other photos of the variations of the species, all the specimens are from Dr. Allard's collection.

References

External links
 Photos of Mecynorhina ugandensis

Cetoniinae
Beetles described in 1907